From the Arab Expansion until the 1960s, Jews were a significant part of the population of Arab countries. Before 1948, an estimated 900,000 Jews lived in what are now Arab states. Here is a list of some prominent Jews from the Arab World, arranged by country of birth.

Al-Andalus
 Dunash ben Labrat, commentator, poet, and grammarian
 Mūsā ibn Maymūn, medieval philosopher and Torah scholar
 Abu Harun Musa bin Ya'acub ibn Ezra, philosopher and linguist
 Hasdai ibn Shaprut, scholar, physician, and diplomat

Algeria

 Isaac Alfasi, Talmudist and posek; best known for his work of halakha
 Jacques Attali, economist, writer
 Cheb i Sabbah, famous club DJ
 Lili Boniche, musician 
 Patrick Bruel, singer, actor
 Alain Chabat, actor
 Hélène Cixous, feminist writer
 Claude Cohen-Tannoudji, physicist, Nobel prize (1997)
 Jacques Derrida, deconstructionist philosopher 
 Alphonse Halimi, boxer; World Bantamweight champion
 Roger Hanin, film actor and director
 Bernard-Henri Lévy, French philosopher
 Enrico Macias (Gaston Ghrenassia), French singer 
 Line Monty (Eliane Sarfati), Algerian singer
 Reinette l'Oranaise, famous Algerian singer from Oran. Known as one of Oran's respected artists. Best known for Nhabek Nhabek and Mazal Haï MazalBahrain
 Menasheh Idafar, of Iraqi descent, former Bahraini/British racing driver with dual citizenship
 Nancy Khedouri, of Iraqi descent , current member of parliament, of Iraqi originMichael Slackman, In a Landscape of Tension, Bahrain Embraces Its Jews. All 36 of Them., Nytimes.com, 5 April 2009
 Ebrahim Daoud Nonoo, of Iraqi descent , former member of parliament
 Houda Ezra Nonoo, of Iraqi descent, former member of parliament and former Ambassador of Bahrain to the US
 Misha Nonoo, of British-Iraqi descent, US-based British-Bahraini fashion designer

Egypt
 André Aciman, writer and academic
 Guy Béart, French singer
 Eli Cohen, celebrated Israeli spy 
 Sir Ronald Cohen, Egyptian-born businessman 
 Jacques Hassoun, psychoanalyst, writer
 Aura Herzog, widow of Chaim Herzog, sixth President of the State of Israel
 Eric Hobsbawm, historian (Jewish-Polish and -German parents living in Cairo) 
 Isaac Israeli ben Solomon, physician and philosopher living in the Arab world 
 Edmond Jabès, poet
 Paula Jacques, writer, journalist, radio show producer
 Jacqueline Kahanoff, writer 
 Ranan Lurie, political cartoonist
 Moshe Marzouk, doctor   
 Roland Moreno, engineer, inventor of the Smart Card
 Layla Murad, singer
 Haim Saban, TV producer
 Saadia ben Yosef, rabbi
 Sylvain Sylvain (Sylvain Mizrahi), guitarist for New York Dolls 
 Bat Ye'or, historian
 Avraham Yosef, rabbi
 Yaakov Yosef, rabbi
 Ahmed Zayat, entrepreneur and owner of Zayat Stables LLC

Iraq

 Many Tannaim and Amoraim, including:
 Abba Arika, "Rabh", amora
 Shmuel Yarchina'ah, "Mar Samuel", or Samuel of Nehardea, amora
 Rav Huna
 Rav Chisda
 Abaye, amora
 Rav Papa, amora
 Rav Ashi (Abana), rav, amora
 Anan ben David, founder of Qara'ism
 Alan Yentob, television executive, broadcaster
 Avi Shlaim, Oxford Professor
 Binyamin Ben-Eliezer, politician
 Dodai ben Nahman, scholar
Shlomo Hillel, diplomat and politician
 Ya'qub Bilbul, poet
 Sir Sassoon Eskell, statesman and financier
 Marcus Samuel, 1st Viscount Bearsted, Lord Mayor of London, businessman
 Naeim Giladi, writer
 Sir Naim Dangoor, entrepreneur and philanthropist
 N.J. Dawood, translator of Koran
 Hakham Yosef Chayyim of Baghdad, "Ben Ish Chai"
 Yitzchak Kadouri, rabbi and kabbalist
 Yitzhak Yamin, painter and sculptor
Hila Klein, member of American-Israeli husband and wife duo h3h3Productions, best known for their YouTube channel of the same name. Family is of mixed Libyan and Iraqi Jewish heritage
 Elie Kedourie, historian
 Jessica Meir, astronaut, physiologist
 Sami Michael*, writer
 Shafiq Ades, wealthy businessman
 Samir Naqqash, novelist
 Selim Zilkha, entrepreneur
 Maurice & Charles Saatchi, advertising executives
 Yona Sabar, scholar, linguist and researcher
 David Sassoon, merchant, and Sassoon family
 Yaakov Chaim Sofer, rabbi
 Ovadia Yosef, rabbi

Kuwait
 Saleh and Daoud Al-Kuwaity, singers of Iranian-Iraqi descent 

Libya
 George Borba, footballer
 Hila Klein, member of American-Israeli husband and wife duo h3h3Productions, best known for their YouTube channel of the same name. Family is of mixed Libyan and Iraqi Jewish heritage 
Moses Hacmon, Israeli artist and architect. Family is of mixed Libyan Jewish, Turkish Jewish and Iraqi Jewish heritage

Lebanon
 David Nahmad, backgammon champion and art dealer
 Yfrah Neaman, violinist 
 Gad Saad, evolutionary behavioral scientist
 Edmond Safra, billionaire banker
 Jacob Safra, founder of Jacob E. Safra Bank 
 Joseph Safra, chairman of all Safra companies

Morocco

 Michel Abitbol, academic at the Hebrew University of Jerusalem
 Amram Aburbeh, Sephardi Dayan, Scholar  Chief Rabbi of Petah Tikva born in Tetouan. Best known of his work Netivei-Am''
 Shlomo Amar, Sephardi Chief Rabbi of Israel
 Robert Assaraf, historian and writer
 André Azoulay, advisor to Kings Hassan II and Mohammed VI
 Shlomo Ben-Ami, Israeli diplomat, politician and author born in Tangier
 Ralph Benmergui, Canadian media personality, born in Tangier
 Raphael Berdugo, dayan, scholar, and rabbi 
 Salomon Berdugo, poet and rabbi from Meknes
 Frida Boccara, singer from Casablanca
 Aryeh Deri, Israeli politician, a former leader of Shas Party
 Edmond Amran El Maleh, writer
 André Elbaz, painter and filmmaker from El Jadida
 Gad Elmaleh, humorist, actor
 Serge Haroche, Nobel-winning physicist
 David Hassine, liturgic poet and rabbi
 Dunash ben Labrat, grammarian, poet
 David Levy, Israeli politician 
 Nahum Ma'arabi, Hebrew poet and translator of the 13th century
 Chalom Messas, Grand Rabbi of Morocco until 2003
 David Messas, Grand Rabbi of Paris since 1995
 Amir Peretz, Israeli politician, leader of the Labour Party
 David Rebibo, congregational rabbi and Jewish day school dean in Phoenix, Arizona
 Baba Sali, rabbi
 Abraham Serfaty, political activist
 Meir Sheetrit, Israeli politician of Kadima
 Avi Toledano, singer who competed at the Eurovision Song Contest
 Mordechai Vanunu, Israeli dissident (converted to Christianity)

Arabia 
 Samaw'al ibn 'Adiya (Samuel ibn 'Adiya), poet, warrior
 David Reubeni, false messiah

Sudan
 Nessim Gaon, financier

Syria
 Ezra Attiya, rabbi and rosh yeshiva
 Émile Benveniste, linguist

Tunisia

 Dove Attia, French-Tunisian musical television producer
 Max Azria, French-Tunisian fashion designer, founder of BCBG
 Roger Bismuth, Tunisian senator
 Alain Boublil, French musical theatre lyricist and librettist
 Michel Boujenah, French Tunisian comedian and humorist
 Paul Boujenah, French-Tunisian film director
 Dany Brillant, French singer
 Claude Challe, French club impresario and DJ
 Pierre Darmon, French tennis player
 Jacques Haïk, French producer
 Gisèle Halimi, Tunisian lawyer and essayist
 Élie Kakou, French actor and humorist
 Pierre Lellouche, French politician
 Albert Memmi, French novelist & sociologist
 Habiba Msika, Tunisian singer, dancer and actress
 Victor Perez, Tunisian boxing world champion
 Silvan Shalom, Israeli politician and former Foreign Minister of Israel
 René Trabelsi, Tunisian Politician
 Nissim Zvili,  Israeli politician and diplomat

Yemen
 Rabbi Nethanel ben Isaiah
 Rabbi Jacob ben Nathanael
 Shoshana Damari, was an Israeli singer.
 Ofra Haza, famous Israeli singer
 Rabbi Yosef Qafih rabbi and leader of Baladi Yemenite Jewish community
 Abdullah ibn Saba, converted to Islam (born Jewish)
 Rabiah ibn Mudhar & Dhu Nuwas, kings of Himyarite
 Wahb bin Munabbih (?–732), converted to Islam (born Persian Jew)
 Rabbi Shalom Shabazi, rabbi and poet
 Rabbi Shalom Sharabi
 Rabbi Yihya Yitzhak HaLevi
 Rabbi Shlomo Korah, chief rabbi of Bnei Brak.
 Rabbi Azarya Basis, chief rabbi of Rosh HaAyin.
 Rabbi Shimon Baadani, leading Sephardi rabbi and rosh kollel in Israel.
 Rabbi Avraham Al-Naddaf, One of the leaders of Yemenite Jews in Jerusalem and Israel.
 Rabbi Chaim Kasar, was the head of the Beit Alshikh and Beit Sharabi yeshivas in Yemen and authored a commentary on "Shem Tov" on Maimonides.
 Rabbi Yihya Al-Shech Halevi, Yemeni rabbi.
 Rabbi Amnon Yitzhak

See also
Arab Jews
Jewish exodus from Arab lands
Jewish refugees
List of Jews
List of Asian Jews
List of South-East European Jews
List of Egyptians
List of Lebanese people
List of Syrians
List of Iraqis
History of the Jews in Tunisia
History of the Jews in Morocco
History of the Jews in Algeria
History of the Jews in Yemen
List of famous Arabs

Footnotes

Arab World
Arab world-related lists

Jews,Arab World